Alessio Manzoni (born 10 April 1987) is an Italian professional footballer who plays as a midfielder for [[Scannabuese
]].

Career

Early years
Manzoni made his senior debut for Atalanta in a Serie B match towards the end of the 2005–06 Serie B season. The game ended 1–0 to Modena. Since then, Manzoni has been on loan at both Padova and Spezia.

Parma
In February 2009, he left for Parma in temporary deal. In summer 2009 Manzoni was signed by Parma in three-year contract for €1.5 million (counter-weight Luca Cigarini transfer fee); Atalanta also retained 50% registration rights. Since January 2010 Manzoni was farmed to various clubs in Serie B and Lega Pro Prima Divisione. In June 2011 Atalanta gave up the remain half of the "card" to Parma.

In July 2012 Manzoni was signed by Gubbio. That season Parma signed Daniele Bazzoffia for undisclosed fee and Mário Rui for €595,000 from Gubbio; Gubbio signed Manzoni, Pietro Baccolo, Jacopo Galimberti and Francesco Pambianchi in temporary deals, subsidized by Parma by performance bonuses. Eventually Gubbio received €548,000 from the loan of Manzoni, Baccolo and Galimberti.

Pavia
In November 2013 he was signed by Pavia as free agent.

Serie D and return to Serie C
After leaving Pavia, he spent the next 5 seasons in the Serie D, 4 of them at Pergolettese, which advanced back to Serie C for the 2019–20 season.

References

External links
 Atalanta B.C. Official Player Profile

1987 births
People from Crema, Lombardy
Footballers from Lombardy
Living people
Italian footballers
Association football midfielders
Italy youth international footballers
Atalanta B.C. players
Calcio Padova players
Spezia Calcio players
Parma Calcio 1913 players
Brescia Calcio players
U.C. AlbinoLeffe players
Frosinone Calcio players
A.S. Gubbio 1910 players
F.C. Pavia players
U.S. Pergolettese 1932 players
Serie A players
Serie B players
Serie C players
Serie D players
Sportspeople from the Province of Cremona